The MONY Syracuse Senior Classic was a golf tournament on the Champions Tour from 1982 to 1991. It was played in Syracuse, New York at the Bellevue Country Club (1982–1984) and in Jamesville, New York at the Lafayette Country Club (1985–1991).

The purse for the 1991 tournament was US$400,000, with $60,000 going to the winner. The tournament was founded in 1982 as the Greater Syracuse Senior's Pro Golf Classic.

Winners
MONY Syracuse Senior Classic
1991 Rocky Thompson
1990 Jim Dent
1989 Jim Dent
1988 Dave Hill
1987 Bruce Crampton

MONY Syracuse Senior's Pro Golf Classic
1986 Bruce Crampton

MONY Syracuse Senior's Classic
1985 Peter Thomson

Greater Syracuse Senior's Pro Classic
1984 Miller Barber
1983 Gene Littler

Greater Syracuse Senior's Pro Golf Classic
1982 Bill Collins

Source:

References

Former PGA Tour Champions events
Golf in Syracuse, New York
Recurring sporting events disestablished in 1991
1982 establishments in New York (state)
1991 disestablishments in New York (state)
Events in Syracuse, New York